Chamarajnagar is an alternate way to spell the following places in India:
 Chamarajanagar, a city in the state of Karnataka
 Chamarajanagar district, the district thereof